Katrín Ómarsdóttir (born 27 June 1987) is an Icelandic football coach and former player who played the midfielder position. Before spending four seasons in the English FA WSL with Liverpool and Doncaster Rovers Belles from 2013, she had played professional football in Sweden and the United States. Katrín has over 60 caps for Iceland's national team and represented her country at the 2009 and 2013 editions of the UEFA Women's Championship.

Club career
Born in Hamburg, Katrín made her club debut for KR of the Úrvalsdeild kvenna when she was 14 years old. She represented KR in the inaugural season of the UEFA Women's Cup in 2001–02.

Katrín attended the University of California, Berkeley in the United States and played for their women's soccer team from 2008 until 2010. She was signed by Kristianstads DFF of the Damallsvenskan for the summer of 2010. In 2011, she returned to California to play for new Women's Premier Soccer League (WPSL) franchise Orange County Waves. She scored six goals in nine regular season appearances as the team won the 2011 WPSL Championship.

In January 2012 Katrín agreed to join Philadelphia Independence of Women's Professional Soccer (WPS), but the league folded before the season started. Instead she returned to Kristianstads and played out the 2012 Damallsvenskan season, scoring four goals in 21 appearances.

In January 2013 Katrín signed for Liverpool Ladies, who had finished bottom of the FA WSL in 2011 and 2012 but were investing heavily in improving their team. She scored the second goal as Liverpool beat Bristol Academy 2–0 on the final day to secure the league title. Liverpool retained their league title in 2014 but fared poorly in 2015, finishing seventh of eight teams. Katrín was among four players to be released by the club at the end of the season.

On New Year's Eve 2015 Katrín joined Doncaster Rovers Belles, alongside veteran Liverpool teammate Becky Easton. Doncaster were relegated after only winning one game all season, secured by Katrín's winning goal against Reading F.C. Women. She left the club at the expiry of her one-year contract, and promptly re-joined KR. In November 2020 she joined the coaching staff at KR, but continued to be available a player.

In November 2021, Katrín joined the coach staff of Haukar. She left the club along with manager Guðrún Jóna Kristjánsdóttir in end of June 2022.

International career
Katrín made her senior debut for Iceland in August 2006, a 1–0 home defeat to Sweden in the 2007 FIFA Women's World Cup qualifiers.

At UEFA Women's Euro 2009, Katrín played in two of the three group matches as Iceland were eliminated in the first round. National team coach Siggi Eyjólfsson also selected Katrín in his Iceland squad for UEFA Women's Euro 2013.

Honours
WSL Women's Super League (2)
 2013, 2014
Icelandic champion (2)
 2002, 2003
Icelandic Cup (3)
 2002, 2007, 2008

References

External links

California player page

1987 births
California Golden Bears women's soccer players
Living people
Katrin Omarsdottir
Katrin Omarsdottir
Katrin Omarsdottir
Kristianstads DFF players
Damallsvenskan players
Liverpool F.C. Women players
Doncaster Rovers Belles L.F.C. players
Women's Super League players
Expatriate women's footballers in England
Expatriate women's footballers in Sweden
Expatriate women's soccer players in the United States
Women's association football midfielders
Orange County Waves players